Mark Lawrence (born 16 June 1965, Standerton) is an international rugby union referee from South Africa. He refereed his first international test match, in 2000, and was chosen to officiate at both the 2003 Rugby World Cup and 2007 Rugby World Cup acting as a touch judge and a TMO in both competitions. He refereed the 2007 Currie Cup Final between the Free State Cheetahs and the Golden Lions,. He also refereed the 2008 Super 14 Final between the Crusaders and the Waratahs.

In September 2011, he announced his retirement from test rugby to concentrate on coaching emerging referees.

References

1965 births
Living people
South African rugby union referees
Super Rugby referees
Currie Cup referees
The Rugby Championship referees
Six Nations Championship referees